Angelo Daniel Badalamenti (March 22, 1937 – December 11, 2022) was an American composer and arranger best known for his work in composing for films. He is best known for his acclaimed collaborations with director David Lynch, notably the scores for Blue Velvet (1986), the Twin Peaks television series (both the original 1990–1992 television series and the 2017 revival), The Straight Story (1999), and Mulholland Drive (2001).

Badalamenti also composed scores for such films as National Lampoon's Christmas Vacation (1989), The City of Lost Children (1995), Holy Smoke! (1999), and A Very Long Engagement (2004). He also recorded songs with artists including Julee Cruise (in collaboration with Lynch), Nina Simone, Shirley Bassey, Pet Shop Boys, Dusty Springfield, Marianne Faithfull, David Bowie, Tim Booth, Siouxsie Sioux and Dolores O'Riordan.

In 1990, Badalamenti received the Grammy Award for Best Pop Instrumental Performance for his "Twin Peaks Theme" at the 32nd Annual Grammy Awards. Badalamenti received a lifetime achievement award from the World Soundtrack Awards's Academy in 2008 and the Henry Mancini Award from the American Society of Composers, Authors and Publishers in 2011.

Early life
Angelo Daniel Badalamenti was born on March 22, 1937, in Brooklyn, New York, the second of four children born to John and Leonora (née Ferrari) Badalamenti. His father, who was of Sicilian descent from the town of Cinisi, was a fish market owner. He began taking piano lessons at age eight. By the time Badalamenti was a teenager, his aptitude at the piano earned him a summer job accompanying singers at resorts in the Catskill Mountains. His elder brother was a jazz trumpet player who used to improvise with other musicians. He also went to Latin American dance clubs. He attended Lafayette High School, where he wrote the processional march for his high school graduation. After graduating, he enrolled at the Eastman School of Music at the University of Rochester, but after two years he transferred to the Manhattan School of Music, where he earned a bachelor's degree in 1958 and a master's degree in 1959. He began composing music pieces in Kurt Weill's style.

Film and television scoring
Badalamenti scored films such as Gordon's War, and Law and Disorder, but his break came when he was brought in to be Isabella Rossellini's singing coach for the song "Blue Velvet" in David Lynch's 1986 film Blue Velvet. Badalamenti and Lynch collaborated to write "Mysteries of Love" using lyrics Lynch wrote and Badalamenti's music. Julee Cruise, who went on to work with Lynch and Badalamenti on other projects, performed the vocals for that track. Badalamenti composed the score for the film and served as music supervisor. Lynch's request to the composer was for the score  to be "like Shostakovich, be very Russian, but make it the most beautiful thing but make it dark and a little bit scary." Badalamenti appears in Blue Velvet as the piano player in the club where Rossellini's character performs. This film was the first of what would become a career-long collaborative relationship spanning television and film. Badalamenti dubbed their partnership "my second best marriage".

After scoring a variety of mainstream films, including A Nightmare on Elm Street 3: Dream Warriors and National Lampoon's Christmas Vacation, Badalamenti once again collaborated with Lynch and scored Lynch's cult television show, Twin Peaks, featuring the vocals of Julee Cruise on the leading song "Falling". Twin Peaks would become the score Badalamenti is perhaps best known for, one that helped define the overall style and mood of the show. The score features different themes patterned after specific characters in the show—"Audrey's Dance", for example, is an "abstract jazzy" theme that plays when Audrey Horne (played by Sherilyn Fenn) is on-screen. Many of the songs from the series were released on Cruise's album Floating into the Night. From the soundtrack of the television series, he was awarded the Grammy Award for Best Pop Instrumental Performance for the "Twin Peaks Theme". it also earned a gold plaque from the RIAA. Between 1991 and 1993, Badalamenti and Lynch collaborated on the project Thought Gang, the results of which were released in 2018.

Other Lynch projects he worked on include the movies Wild at Heart, Twin Peaks: Fire Walk with Me, Lost Highway, The Straight Story, Mulholland Drive (where he has a small role as a gangster with a finicky taste for espresso), and Rabbits as well as the television shows On the Air and Hotel Room. Other projects with other directors he worked in include the television film Witch Hunt, and the films Naked in New York, The City of Lost Children, A Very Long Engagement, The Wicker Man, Dark Water and Secretary.  He has also worked on the soundtrack for the video game Fahrenheit (known as Indigo Prophecy in North America). He was composer for director Paul Schrader on such films as Auto Focus, The Comfort of Strangers and Dominion: Prequel to the Exorcist.

In 1995, he asked Marianne Faithfull to write lyrics for a song, for the soundtrack of Jean-Pierre Jeunet's The City of Lost Children; the result was "Who Will Take My Dreams Away".

In 1998, Badalamenti recorded "A Foggy Day (in London Town)" with David Bowie for the Red Hot Organization's compilation album Red Hot + Rhapsody, a tribute to George Gershwin which raised money for various charities devoted to increasing AIDS awareness and fighting the disease. Badalamenti had sent a demo of the song with his own vocals to the record company and Bowie was the first singer to contact him back.  In 1999, he worked with director Jane Campion,  for the film Holy Smoke!, and scored the music, after a few days of working with Campion.

In 2005, he composed the themes for the movie Napola (Before the Fall), which were then adapted for the score by Normand Corbeil. In 2008, he composed  and directed the soundtrack of The Edge of Love: Siouxsie Sioux sang the Weill-influenced "Careless Love", and Patrick Wolf and Beth Rowley recorded vocals for several other tracks.

Badalamenti received the Lifetime Achievement Award at the World Soundtrack Awards on October 18, 2008, in Ghent, Belgium. That night, he performed a concert at the piano with the Brussels Philharmonic orchestra directed by Dirk Brossé, and Siouxsie Sioux and Beth Rowley on vocals. The concert spanning his whole career with a selection of tracks, was broadcast on Belgian television.

On July 23, 2011, the American Society of Composers, Authors and Publishers presented Badalamenti with the Henry Mancini Award for his accomplishments in film and television music.

The 2017 revival of the Twin Peaks television series marked the continuation of Badalamenti's work with David Lynch. Its score features new compositions by Badalamenti, as well as material from the original score.

Collaborations
From the start, he collaborated with other songwriters. In 1964, he contributed to Beatlemania by arranging, conducting, and co-writing a Christmas novelty single entitled "Santa, Bring Me Ringo", which was performed by Christine Hunter. In 1966, Badalamenti co-wrote a song ("Visa to the Stars") on Perrey and Kingsley's album The In Sound from Way Out! In 1967, using the name "Andy Badale", he co-wrote a song ("Pioneers of the Stars") for Perrey and Kingsley's next album, Kaleidoscopic Vibrations: Electronic Pop Music From Way Out. The same year, he co-wrote (with Norm Simon) "I Want to Love You for What You Are", a No. 54 pop hit for Ronnie Dove. He also arranged, produced, and co-wrote some songs on Perrey's two solo albums for Vanguard Records using the "Andy Badale" pseudonym. 

Among his credits, Badalamenti wrote songs for singers such as Nina Simone and Shirley Bassey. In 1967, Badalamenti co-wrote the song "I Hold No Grudge" for Simone’s album High Priestess of Soul. In 1968, he wrote "I've Been Loved" with Sammy Cahn for Bassey’s album This Is My Life.

In 1987, he lent his services to British synth-pop duo Pet Shop Boys, arranging the orchestration on "It Couldn't Happen Here". He also arranged the strings on two tracks on their Behaviour album in 1990.

He was the arranger on songs of artists such as Dusty Springfield and Paul McCartney. He arranged Springfield's single "Nothing Has Been Proved" in 1989 which was written by the Pet Shop Boys. He worked for McCartney at Abbey Road in late 1992 for an unreleased song "Is it raining in London?" which was written by McCartney with Hamish Stuart.

He conceived entire albums with singers such as Julee Cruise, Marianne Faithfull and Tim Booth of the band James. In 1993, he directed with Lynch an album for Cruise, The Voice of Love, which included several tracks from Twin Peaks. Also in 1993, Badalamenti collaborated with thrash metal band Anthrax on the Twin Peaks-inspired track "Black Lodge" from the Sound of White Noise album.

In 1995, he composed, orchestrated and produced Faithfull's album, A Secret Life. In 1996, he teamed up with Tim Booth, as Booth and the Bad Angel: they released the eponymous album on the Mercury label. In 2000, he worked with Orbital on the "Beached" single for the movie The Beach. In 2004, he composed the Evilenko soundtrack working with Dolores O'Riordan, who sang the main theme and with whom he continued collaborating.

Other projects
Badalamenti composed the opening theme for the 1992 Summer Olympics in Barcelona.

Live performances
Badalamenti performed at a concert entitled "The Music of David Lynch" in 2015, in recognition of the tenth anniversary of the David Lynch Foundation. The performance was held at Ace Hotel Los Angeles and included Julee Cruise and other artists known for collaborating with Lynch.

Personal life
Badalamenti and his wife, Lonny, married in 1968 and had two children. He died of natural causes at his home in Lincoln Park, New Jersey, on December 11, 2022, at age 85. Following his death, several industry figures paid tribute to Badalamenti. David Lynch, during his daily installment of Weather Report on December 12, said, "Today—no music".

Discography

Awards
 1990: Grammy Award for Best Pop Instrumental Performance: "Twin Peaks Theme"
 1993: Saturn Award for Best Music: Twin Peaks: Fire Walk with Me
 2008: World Soundtrack Awards: Lifetime Achievement Award
 2011: American Society of Composers, Authors and Publishers: Henry Mancini Award

See also
List of noted film producer and composer collaborations

References

External links
 Official site
 
 
 
 
 Entry at discogs.com as Andy Badale

 
1937 births
2022 deaths
20th-century American composers
21st-century American composers
American film score composers
American male film score composers
American people of Italian descent
People from Lincoln Park, New Jersey
People of Sicilian descent
American television composers
Eastman School of Music alumni
Grammy Award winners
Lafayette High School (New York City) alumni
Male television composers
Manhattan School of Music alumni
Musicians from Brooklyn
Varèse Sarabande Records artists
Windham Hill Records artists
Warner Records artists
East West Records artists
London Records artists
Hollywood Records artists
La-La Land Records artists
Nonesuch Records artists